Galen Partners is a healthcare-focused growth equity investment firm. With nearly $1-billion invested over five funds, Galen has helped build more than 70 companies since inception. 

Since its establishment in 1990, Galen has created an investment portfolio with an aggregate market value of over $10-billion. The firm follows a tradition of strategic collaboration and partnership with founders of the company and management teams to build healthcare market leaders. 

Under the direction of the Managing Directors Philip Borden, David Jahns and Zubeen Shroff, Galen seeks to make investments in high-growth healthcare companies with revenues greater than $10-million and EBITDA of up to $9 million. In September 2020, Steve Cashman, the ex-CCO of InTouch Health, joined the firm as Special Investment Partner.

In 2006, the company relocated its headquarters from New York City's Rockefeller Center to Stamford, Connecticut.

Portfolio Companies
Current and past investments include:
Acura Pharmaceuticals
Aperio Technologies
Cambrooke Therapeutics
CBLPath
CDx Diagnostics
Chamberlin Edmond and Associates
Dow Pharmaceutical Sciences (Valeant)
EduNeering (Kaplan)
Encore Medical Corporation (DJO)
International Medical Group
InTouch Health
JDS Pharmaceuticals (Noven)
lifeIMAGE
Lumenos (Anthem)
Medassets
Medical Imaging Holdings (Unisyn)
Medicode (United Healthcare)
MiniMed (Medtronic Minimed)
National Rehab Equipment (McKesson)
Ocular Sciences (Cooper Vision)
PeriGen
Pyxis (Cardinal Health)
Quotient Limited
Sharecare
SonaCare
Stericycle
Tactile Medical
Taro Pharmaceuticals

References

External links
 Company Website

Venture capital firms of the United States
Financial services companies established in 1990
Private equity firms of the United States